Jean-Baptiste Prosper Jollois (4 January 1776 – 24 June 1842) was a French engineer who together with Édouard de Villiers du Terrage journeyed with Napoleon to Egypt, and prepared the Description de l'Égypte.

1776 births
1842 deaths
French Egyptologists